IRR or Irr may refer to:

Finance
 Implied repo rate, in the futures market
 Internal rate of return, a profitability metric
 Iranian rial, currency of Iran by ISO 4217 code
 Interest rate risk, financial risk from fluctuating interest rates

Organisations
 Incident Response Regiment (Australia), an emergency response agency
 Institute of Race Relations, a policy institute
 Institute for Religious Research, an apologetics organization
 Iraqi Republic Railways, a transportation operator
South African Institute of Race Relations, a think tank

Science and technology
 Image rejection ratio, a radio metric
 Interrupt Request Register, a register used for managing interrupts in programmable interrupt controllers
 Internet Routing Registry, a network routing database
 Irregular galaxy, a galaxy that does not have a distinct regular shape

Other
 Incidence rate ratio, a statistic derived from a Poisson regression model
 Individual Ready Reserve, a personnel status of the United States Military
 Infusion-related reaction or infusion reaction, a form of systemic inflammatory response syndrome caused by some diseases or drugs
 Inner Ring Road (disambiguation)
 Inter-rater reliability